Local elections in the Philippines took place on May 9, 2022. These were conducted together with the 2022 general election for national positions. All elected positions above the barangay (village) level but below the regional level were disputed. The following 18,180 positions will be disputed:

 81 provincial governorships and vice-governorships
 782 Provincial Board (Sangguniang Panlalawigan) members
 1,634 mayorships and vice-mayorships
 13,558 city and municipal councilors (Sangguniang Panlungsod and Sangguniang Bayan)

The elective positions in the Bangsamoro was originally scheduled to be held with these elections, but was postponed to 2025, concurrently with the 2025 elections.

The elective positions in the barangays won't be decided on this day as well. These will be held on December 5, 2022.

Provincial elections 
There are 81 provinces of the Philippines. Compostela Valley, which had a successful renaming plebiscite in 2019, will be known as "Davao de Oro" starting this election. All provinces have a governor and vice governor, each elected separately. Each province is also divided into at least two provincial board districts that elect 1 to 7 board members.

Notes

City elections 
There are 146 cities of the Philippines. Santo Tomas, Batangas is the newest city and will elect city officials for the first time in this election. All cities have a mayor and vice mayor, each elected separately. Each city also elects 6 to 12 councilors, mostly at-large, although some are divided into council districts.

Highly urbanized cities 

Notes

Independent component cities

Component cities

Region I (Ilocos Region)

Cordillera Administrative Region

Region II (Cagayan Valley)

Region III (Central Luzon) 

Notes

Region IV-A (Calabarzon) 

Notes

Mimaropa

Region V (Bicol Region) 

Notes

Region VI (Western Visayas) 

Notes

Region VII (Central Visayas) 

Notes

Region VIII (Eastern Visayas)

Region IX (Zamboanga Peninsula)

Region X (Northern Mindanao)

Region XI (Davao Region)

Region XII (Soccsksargen)

Region XIII (Caraga)

Bangsamoro

Municipal elections 
There are 1,489 municipalities of the Philippines. All municipalities have a mayor and vice mayor, each elected separately. Each municipality also elects 8 councilors at-large, except for Pateros, which elects six councilors in each of its two council districts.

Municipality

Metro Manila

Calabarzon

References